Mark Thomas is an Australian former professional rugby league footballer who played in the 1970s, 1980s and 1990s. A Queensland state and Australia national representative centre, he played his club football in Brisbane for Brothers and Eastern Suburbs, and in England for Leigh (Heritage No. 933), and Warrington (Heritage No. 889).

Playing career
In 1977 Thomas was selected to play for Queensland against New South Wales and against the visiting Great Britain team. He was then selected to go on the Australia national rugby league team's tour of New Zealand. He was then selected to play for Australia in the opening match of the 1977 World Cup tournament against New Zealand.

Thomas was an interchange/substitute in Warrington's 14-36 defeat by Wigan in the 1990 Challenge Cup Final at Wembley Stadium, London on Saturday 28 April 1990, in front of a crowd of 77,729. During the 1990 Kangaroo tour of Great Britain and France Thomas played for Warrington against Australia. Thomas played as an interchange/substitute, i.e. number 14, (replacing left- Gary Chambers on 41-minutes), and scored a try in Warrington's 12-2 victory over Bradford in the 1991 Regal Trophy Final at Headingley, Leeds on Saturday 12 January 1991.

References

Living people
Australia national rugby league team players
Australian rugby league players
Eastern Suburbs Tigers players
Leigh Leopards players
Past Brothers players
Queensland rugby league team players
Rugby league centres
Rugby league forwards
Warrington Wolves players
Year of birth missing (living people)